Lorenzo Jerald Patterson (born June 16, 1969), better known by his stage name MC Ren, is an American rapper, songwriter and record producer from Compton, California. He is the founder and owner of the record label Villain Entertainment.

MC Ren began his career as a solo artist signed to Eazy-E's Ruthless Records in early 1987, while still attending high school. By the end of 1987, after having written nearly half of Eazy-Duz-It, he became a member of N.W.A. After the group disbanded in 1991, he stayed with Ruthless, releasing three solo albums including the controversial Shock of the Hour before leaving the label in 1998.

In 2016, he was inducted into the Rock and Roll Hall of Fame as a member of N.W.A.

Early life
Lorenzo Jerald Patterson was born in Compton, California, on June 16, 1969, and raised in Pannes Ave. around Kelly Park. He grew up with his parents, two brothers and a sister. His father used to work for "the government", until he later opened up his own barber shop. Patterson joined the Kelly Park Compton Crips (of which Eazy-E would also become a member) in attempt to make money, but soon departed and turned to drug dealing as he felt it was more lucrative. Following a raid on his childhood friend MC Chip's house, Patterson quit dealing and focused thereafter on making music.

Patterson attended Dominguez High School, where he met his future collaborator, DJ Train. At this time, he developed an interest in hip hop music, and began writing songs with MC Chip, with whom he formed the group Awesome Crew, and performed at parties and nightclubs. Patterson officially began his rap career upon joining forces with another childhood friend, Eric "Eazy-E" Wright, in 1985. Patterson graduated from high school in 1987 and he planned to join the United States Army after graduation, but changed his mind after watching the 1987 film Full Metal Jacket.

Music career

Career beginnings: 1987–1991
In 1987, Patterson was signed as a solo artist to Eazy-E's Ruthless Records, while still attending high school. However, when Ice Cube went to study for a year, Ren was asked to write songs for the in-progress Eazy-Duz-It. After writing much of the album, MC Ren was asked to join the group N.W.A. They immediately started on the album Straight Outta Compton. With a budget of US$8,000, the album was finished in four weeks and released in August 1988. Propelled by "Fuck tha Police", the album became a major success, despite an almost complete absence of radio airplay or major concert tours. The FBI sent Ruthless a warning letter in response to the song's content.

One month after Straight Outta Compton, Eazy-Duz-It was released, with lyrics largely written by Patterson, with contributions from Ice Cube and The D.O.C.

Following Ice Cube's departure from the group in 1989, N.W.A quickly released the EP 100 Miles and Runnin' with lyrics written by Patterson, with contributions by The D.O.C. The group's second full-length studio album, Niggaz4Life, was released the next year. Selling 955,000 copies in the 1st week and was certified as Platinum, it became the first rap album to enter #1 on the Billboard charts. This album would become the group's final, as Dr. Dre left the group over financial disputes with Jerry Heller.

According to Patterson, it was common opinion that Heller was the one receiving their due:

Solo career: 1992–present
As N.W.A disbanded, Patterson started recording his first solo release titled Kizz My Black Azz. The 6-track EP was entirely produced by DJ Bobcat, except for one song that Patterson produced himself. Released in summer 1992, the EP was a hit, commercially and critically. Without any radio play, the EP went Platinum within 2 months.

Patterson began recording for his debut album, at that time called Life Sentence, in late 1992. During the recording process, Patterson joined The Nation Of Islam with guidance from DJ Train. This caused him to scrap Life Sentence, and Shock Of The Hour was released in late 1993. The album debuted at #1 on the R&B charts, selling 321,000 copies in its first month. Shock of the Hour was regarded as being more focused, yet even more controversial, and critics accused him again of being anti-white, misogynist, and antisemitic. The album is thematically divided into two sides; the first half deals with social issues like ghetto life, drug addiction, racism and poverty. The second half shows
Patterson's political side, as this half was recorded after he joined the Nation of Islam. The album features the hit singles "Same Ol' Shit" and "Mayday On The Frontline".

After 2 years of not talking to each other, Patterson reunited with Eazy-E in 1994 to produce their duet song "Tha Muthpukkin' Real" produced by DJ Yella, with Patterson co-producing. Three months later; on March 26, 1995, Eazy-E would die from complications of AIDS. The song "Tha Muthpukkin' Real" was released as a single in 1995.

Patterson soon fell on hard times when both DJ Train and Eazy-E died before the release of The Villain in Black. The album, which was released in early 1996 and represented Patterson's first attempt at imitating the G-funk sound of Dr. Dre's The Chronic, was not well received by critics. It was also heavily criticized for what many saw as Patterson's pandering to gangsta rap at the cost of a reduction in the sociopolitical content found on his earlier releases. The album debuted at #31 on the pop-charts, with the first week's sales of 31,000 copies. By the second month it had sold 131,000 copies.

Before leaving Ruthless, Patterson released Ruthless for Life in 1998, which proved a small comeback, selling moderately well. The album features Ice Cube, Snoop Dogg, RBX and 8Ball & MJG, and others. This was the first time Patterson worked with new producers. By the end of 1998, Patterson had left Ruthless. 

On October 31, 2009, Patterson released his fourth studio album entitled Renincarnated, which was released under his own record label Villain. Renincarnated was only released in the US.

In 2015, Patterson stated that he had been working on his second EP, titled Rebel Music and released two singles: the title track, "Rebel Music", and "Burn Radio Burn". The official remix for "Rebel Music" was released in June 2014, and features Ice Cube. It was originally expected to be released by the end of 2015 but remained unreleased until 2022 when he canceled the project and followed it up with a new EP, Osiris via Twitter. 

On May 22, 2022, he announced the track list of Osiris, and released the EP on June 3, 2022. The eight-track EP is entirely produced by Tha Chill and features guest appearances from Kurupt, Kokane, Cold 187um, Ras Kass and others.

Collaborations: 1987–present
In 1988, Patterson contributed to Eazy-Duz-It. Although officially released as a solo album by Eazy-E, numerous artists contributed. Patterson; the only guest rapper on the album, features raps of his own on almost half of the album. The album was produced by Dr. Dre and DJ Yella, while Patterson, Ice Cube and The D.O.C. wrote the lyrics.

In 1990, Patterson produced the debut album for his protege group CPO, titled To Hell and Black. The group consisted of CPO Boss Hogg, DJ Train, and Young D. After the release of their debut album, the group dissolved. CPO Boss Hogg went to have a solo career, featuring on high-profile albums of N.W.A, Dr. Dre and Tupac, while DJ Train stayed with Patterson.

In 1993, Patterson introduced a new group called The Whole Click. The group featured Patterson's longtime collaborator Bigg Rocc, Grinch, Bone and Patterson's brother, Juvenile. The group first appeared on Patterson's debut album Shock of the Hour. The collective later split up. Bigg Rocc continued to collaborate with Patterson, featuring him on all his solo albums.

In 2000, he appeared on the song "Hello", which featured Dr. Dre and Ice Cube on Ice Cube's War & Peace Vol. 2 (The Peace Disc) album. He joined the Up In Smoke Tour that same year to rap his verse on the track. He also appeared on the posse cut "Some L.A. Niggaz" from Dr. Dre's 2001 album.

Patterson's recent work has appeared on some more politically oriented projects with Public Enemy, specifically Paris's album Hard Truth Soldiers Vol. 1 as well as on Public Enemy's album Rebirth of a Nation. Paris stated in an interview with rapstation.com that: "MC Ren is retired and won't be doing a full-length album as far as I know. I get at him for verses, that's about it."

In April 2016, Patterson reunited with the former members of N.W.A at Coachella.

Other ventures

Film career
In 1992, Patterson was offered the role for A-Wax in Menace II Society. Despite accepting the role, Patterson later changed his mind and the role was given to MC Eiht.

In 2004, Patterson released the straight-to-DVD film Lost in the Game. The movie was produced, written and directed by Patterson, with Playboy T assisting. It was an independent movie released by Patterson's company Villain.

Patterson was portrayed by Aldis Hodge in the 2015 N.W.A biopic Straight Outta Compton.

Personal life
In June 1993, he married Yaasamen Alaa, with whom he has five children. His oldest son, Anthony, is an aspiring rapper under the name "Waxxie", and has collaborated with other sons of N.W.A members.

In April 1993, Patterson began attending a mosque, and by July he was a fully registered member of the Nation of Islam, known as Lorenzo X. Two years later he left the organization and converted to Sunni Islam.

Artistry

Influences
Patterson stated that KRS-One, Chuck D, Rakim, Big Daddy Kane, and Run-DMC are his biggest influences. MC Ren also stated Criminal Minded by Boogie Down Productions as his all-time favorite hip hop album.

Musical style
Together with N.W.A., Patterson popularized the sub-genre of the Gangsta rap and West Coast Hip Hop, while also being credited by many as one of the seminal groups in the history of hip hop music. He also endured controversy due to his music's explicit lyrics that many viewed as being disrespectful of women, as well as its glorification of drugs and crime.

Patterson is noted as a proficient lyricist and storyteller and is regarded for his honesty, as he often includes his political views in his music. Most of his lyrics focus on controversial issues in global politics. The views expressed in his lyrics are largely commentary on issues such as class struggle, socialism, poverty, religion, government, imperialism and institutional racism.

Discography

Studio albums
Shock of the Hour (1993)
The Villain in Black (1996)
Ruthless for Life (1998)
Renincarnated (2009)

Collaboration albums
N.W.A. and the Posse with N.W.A (1987)
Straight Outta Compton with N.W.A (1988)
Niggaz4Life with N.W.A (1991)

Extended plays
Kizz My Black Azz (1992)
Osiris (2022)

Filmography

References

External links

 Official Website
 
 

1969 births
Living people
20th-century American male actors
20th-century American rappers
21st-century American rappers
African-American male actors
African-American male rappers
African-American Muslims
African-American songwriters
American male film actors
American male rappers
American male songwriters
American Sunni Muslims
Converts to Islam
Crips
Epic Records artists
Former Nation of Islam members
Gangsta rappers
G-funk artists
Male actors from California
Male actors from Los Angeles
Musicians from Compton, California
N.W.A members
Priority Records artists
Rappers from Los Angeles
Ruthless Records artists
Songwriters from California